Network management software is software that is used to provision, discover, monitor and maintain computer networks.

Purpose

With the expansion of the World Wide Web and the Internet, computer networks have become very large and complex, making them impossible to manage manually. In response, a suite of network management software was developed to help reduce the burden of managing the growing complexity of computer networks. Network management software usually collects information about network devices (which are called Nodes) using protocols like SNMP, ICMP, CDP etc. This information is then presented to network administrators in an easy to understand and accessible manner to help them quickly identify and remediate problems. Problems may present itself in the form of network faults, performance bottlenecks, compliance issues etc. Some advanced network management software may rectify network problems automatically. Network management software may also help with tasks involved in provisioning new networks, such as installing and configuring new network nodes etc. They may also help with maintenance of existing networks like upgrading software on existing network devices, creating new virtual networks etc.

Functions

Provisioning: This function enables network managers to provision new network devices in an environment. Automating this step reduces cost and eliminates chances of human error.

Mapping or Discovery: This function enables the software to discover the features of a target network. Some features that are usually discovered are: the nodes in a network, the connectivity between these nodes, the vendor types and capabilities for these nodes, the performance characteristics etc.

Monitoring:  This function enables the network management software to monitor the network for problems and to suggest improvements. The software may poll the devices periodically or register itself to receive alerts from network devices. One mechanism for network devices to volunteer information about itself is by sending an SNMP Trap. Monitoring can reveal faults in the network such as failed or misconfigured nodes, performance bottlenecks, malicious actors, intrusions etc.

Configuration management: This function enables the software to ensure that the network configuration is as desired and there is no configuration drift.

Regulatory compliance: This function enables the network management software to ensure that the network meets the regulatory standards and complies with applicable laws.

Change control: This function enables the software to ensure that the network changes are enacted in a controlled and coordinated manner. Change control can enable audit trails which has applications during a forensic investigation after a network intrusion.

Software Asset Management: This function enabled the software to inventory software installed on nodes along with details like version and install date. Additionally, it can also provide software deployment and patch management.

Cybersecurity: This function enabled the software to use all the data gathered from the nodes to identify security risks in an IT environment.

References 

Network management